Xtra Heat (March 3, 1998—December 2022) was an American Thoroughbred Champion  racehorse and broodmare. Despite competing almost exclusively at sprint distances, she was named American Champion Three-Year-Old Filly at the Eclipse Awards for 2001.  She was inducted into the National Museum of Racing & Hall of Fame in 2015.

Background
Xtra Heat was a bay mare bred in Kentucky by Pope McLean. She was by far the most successful horse sired by the Louisiana Derby winner Dixieland Heat. During her racing career she was owned by Kenneth Taylor, Harry Deitchman, and her trainer, John Salzman, Sr.

Racing career
In 2001, Xtra Heat set a new track record for six furlongs at Pimlico Race Course. Although she ran second by a neck in the 2001 Breeders' Cup Sprint to winner Squirtle Squirt, her performances that year earned Xtra Heat the Eclipse Award as American Champion Three-Year-Old Filly.

Xtra Heat was retired after campaigning in 2003, having won 26 of her 35 lifetime starts and with earnings in excess of $2.3 million.

On November 3, 2002, following the Breeders' Cup, Xtra Heat was auctioned at the Fasig-Tipton November Select Sale. She failed to sell when bidding "stalled" at $1.7 million and was returned to her owners. But on November 5, 2002, it was announced that the ClassicStar partnership (consisting of S. David Plummer, Tony Ferguson, Thom Robinson, and John Parrot) purchased Xtra Heat privately. The price was not disclosed.

Breeding career
Xtra Heat produced 14 foals, 12 of which have raced. Among her successful foals are the Gone West-sired Southwestern Heat, winner of the Sonny Hine Stakes at Laurel, and the Elusive Quality-sired Elusive Heat, who won a restricted stakes race at Saratoga.

Death
In March 2023 Woodford Thoroughbreds announced that Xtra Heat died the previous December at the age of 24.

Pedigree

See also
 List of historical horses

References

1998 racehorse births
Thoroughbred family 5-g
Racehorses bred in Kentucky
Racehorses trained in the United States
Eclipse Award winners
United States Thoroughbred Racing Hall of Fame inductees